In these first special programmes (2003), Louis Theroux returned to American themes, working at feature-length, this time with a more serious tone than in his earlier Weird Weekends work. For example, Louis and the Brothel takes a sympathetic look at the sex workers working at a legal brothel in Nevada whereas Under the Knife takes a more critical look at the world of plastic surgery. Other programmes cover a wide variety of topics including law and disorder and Nazis.

In March 2006, Theroux signed a deal with the BBC to produce ten films over the course of three years. In February 2009, a new contract came into force which guaranteed him another ten hour-long documentaries with the BBC.

Episodes

DVD releases
 Louis Theroux: The Strange & The Dangerous - released 19 January 2009
 Gambling in Las Vegas
 The Most Hated Family in America
 Under the Knife
 Behind Bars
 African Hunting Holiday
 Special Feature: The Weird World of Louis Theroux
 Features 'In-Vision' commentaries with contributions from Norman Pace – Gambling in Las Vegas, Peter Tatchell – The Most Hated Family in America, Cindy Jackson – Under the Knife, Paul Taylor – Behind Bars and Terry Nutkins – African Hunting Holiday.
 Louis Theroux: Law & Disorder - released 14 September 2009
 Law and Disorder in Philadelphia
 Law and Disorder in Johannesburg
 A Place for Paedophiles
 The City Addicted to Crystal Meth
 Louis Theroux: The Odd, the Bad and the Godly - released 15 August 2011
 America's Medicated Kids
 Law and Disorder in Lagos
 The Ultra Zionists
 Return to the Most Hated Family
 Miami Mega Jail Part 1
 Miami Mega Jail Part 2

References

See also
 List of Louis Theroux documentaries
 Louis Theroux's Weird Weekends
 When Louis Met...

 
2003 British television series debuts
2010s British television series
2020s British television series
BBC television documentaries
English-language television shows
Louis Theroux